Gottlieb Muffat (25 April 1690 – 9 December 1770), son of Georg Muffat, served as Hofscholar under Johann Fux in Vienna from 1711 and was appointed to the position of third court organist at the Hofkapelle in 1717.  He acquired additional duties over time including the instruction of members of the Imperial family, among them the future Empress Maria Theresa. He was promoted to second organist in 1729 and first organist upon the accession of Maria Theresa to the throne in 1741. He retired from official duties at the court in 1763.

Compositions

Muffat's compositional output is primarily limited to keyboard music. He shows considerable skill as a contrapuntist in the short liturgical fugues published in his first collection  72 Versetl sammt 12 Toccaten (Vienna, 1726).  These pieces reflect a conservative approach  to liturgical music in that they are organized in the order of the church tones with an introductory toccata and a regular number of versets for each tone.

His second publication, Componimenti musicali per il cembalo (Augsburg, ca. 1736), is more progressive in its outlook. This collection of six suites, while maintaining the traditional Allemande, Courante and Saraband format,  is more lavishly ornamented than was characteristic of Austro-German music of that era.  Some of the movements are even given fanciful French titles like La Coquette or L'aimable Esprit as were popular among the clavecinistes.  Short, simple phrases and clear motives characterize the pieces in this set. The preface to this work contains an ornamentation table with symbols and performance instructions for 57 ornaments. The most recent modern edition was done by the late Christopher Hogwood in 2009.

Much of Muffat's output remains unpublished, though it nonetheless contains much music of great interest.  His manuscript containing 32 ricercare and 19 canzonas is remarkable in that it is the largest body of work from his era based on 17th century models.  Like all pupils of Fux, Muffat would have studied the music of Frescobaldi and Froberger during his years of apprenticeship.  In the ricercare, Muffat shows himself to be a master of the stile antico.  Following the usage of the early Baroque,  the contrapuntal ricercare are notated in open score and preserve the sense of modality and sectional structure of the Italian masters.  The canzonas are modeled on the 16th century vocal motet and are livelier and more idiomatically instrumental in style.

Also still in manuscript are the 24 Toccatas and Capriccios. a pairing which seems to be unique to Muffat.  Two styles of toccatas appear in this collection:  one type features a florid melodic line over a supporting chordal structure and the second type utilizes a sectional form that juxtaposes contrasting tempi, meters and textures.  The capriccios represent a variety of styles including prelude, invention, and dance forms.

Muffat and Handel

It is well established that Handel borrowed copiously from his contemporaries, including Muffat.  While it would be easy to cast aspersions at Handel for this seemingly dishonest practice, it hardly diminishes his stature as a composer and probably would not have created much consternation for either party.

It is not known with certainty whether Handel and Muffat had any personal knowledge of each other, but their positions as leading musicians in major European capitals might imply at least a mutual awareness.  There is a copy, in Muffat's own hand, of Handel's Suites des pieces (1720) which Muffat supplied with numerous ornaments along with a few variants of his own design. Modern edition by Hogwood 2007. Muffat as well did his own version of Handel's 6 Fugues for Keyboard (1735) HWV 605-610, first edition from the manuscript by Hogwood 2008. 
For his part, Handel seems to have borrowed extensively from Muffat's Componimenti Musicali with at least 18 of these pieces appearing 30 times in Handel's output.  Handel's Ode to St. Cecilia's Day seems to owe the greatest debt to Muffat, with material from five pieces being reworked into the score.  Not only were themes reused in their entirety, but also counter subjects and continuing phrases were put to use by Handel.  More such examples appear in Handel's oratorios Joshua, Samson, and Judas Maccabeus.  The spirited fugue in the second movement of the Overture to Samson makes extensive use of a Muffat fugue from Componimenti Musicali and a similar borrowing occurs in the third movement of the Overture to Judas Maccabeus.  The March which begins Act II of Joshua is a reworking of a Rigaudon by Muffat.

Notes

References and further reading
 Alison J. Dunlop: The Life and Works of Gottlieb Muffat (1690-1770). Hollitzer, Vienna 2013,

External links

Recordings
Naoko Akutagawa has recorded three CDs of previously unknown harpsichord suites by Muffat for Naxos. They were edited by Glen Wilson for Breitkopf & Härtel from the mainly autograph manuscripts recovered by the Sing-Akademie, Berlin, from Kiev.
 For a sample of Muffat's Suite for harpsichord No. 4 and 5 performed by Mitzi Meyerson, visit the websites below:
 http://www.allmusic.com/performance/suite-for-harpsichord-no-5-in-d-minor-mq0000493609
 http://www.allmusic.com/performance/suite-for-harpsichord-no-4-in-b-flat-major-mq0001321954
 For a sample of Muffat's music performed by Joseph Payne, see link below. 
 http://www.glossamusic.com/glossa/reference.aspx?ctype=7&Id=155

German Baroque composers
Austrian classical composers
Austrian classical organists
Organists and composers in the South German tradition
German male organists
1690 births
1770 deaths
18th-century keyboardists
18th-century classical composers
Austrian male classical composers
18th-century German composers
18th-century German male musicians
Male classical organists